In enzymology, a malate—CoA ligase is an enzyme that catalyzes the chemical reaction

ATP + malate + CoA  ADP + phosphate + malyl-CoA

The 3 substrates of this enzyme are ATP, malate, and CoA, whereas its 3 products are ADP, phosphate, and malyl-CoA.

This enzyme belongs to the family of ligases, specifically those forming carbon-sulfur bonds as acid-thiol ligases.  The systematic name of this enzyme class is malate:CoA ligase (ADP-forming). Other names in common use include malyl-CoA synthetase, malyl coenzyme A synthetase, and malate thiokinase.  This enzyme participates in glyoxylate and dicarboxylate metabolism.

References

 

EC 6.2.1
Enzymes of unknown structure